Dominique Heckmes (1 September 1878 – 4 February 1938) was a Luxembourgian composer and music critic.

1878 births
1938 deaths
Luxembourgian composers